Armed Forces Nursing Academy is a college located in Yuseong-gu, Daejeon, South Korea.

Background
The Armed Forces Nursing Academy of Korea is a 4-year university. It was established for the purpose of providing persons who intend to become a nurse officer of the Armed Forces with necessary education. To complete the nursing degree one must complete two sets of courses. The first are military courses prescribed by the Minister of National Defense. The other courses are general courses prescribed by the Minister of National Defense in collaboration with the Minister of Education.

Qualifications

Staff
The Superintendent is appointed by the Minister of National Defense from among general officers.

Professors
“Professors and associate professors shall be appointed by the President with a recommendation by the Minister of National Defense, assistant professors shall be appointed by the Minister of National Defense with a recommendation by the Superintendent, and teaching assistants shall be appointed by the Superintendent.”

Students
All attendees of the academy will be registered into the military upon admission. One may not be younger than 17 years old or older than 21 years older and must be unmarried. One must also meet the physical standards of the Nursing Academy and have the educational background required. Those who successfully graduate and pass the national nursing examination will be commissioned as a second lieutenant in the Korean Military. Graduates will also obtain their Bachelors in Nursing. Those who fail will be removed from the military registry.

Influences and history of nursing education in Korea
During the time of the Japanese occupation, Korea's health care facilities and nursing education had been disorganized. The education and nursing system lacked a lot of resources and information that was needed for the profession. They also lacked the means to be able to educate others in the field properly. In 1946, the U.S military had unified the nursing education. They standardized the curriculum for Korea and helped provide instruction for the faculty in the nursing education facilities. During the Korean War both Korean and American nurses played a large role. However, after the war Korea had to focus on reestablishing and furthering the Korean nursing education. As a part of nursing education, emphasis had been placed on midwifery as well.

References 

Military academies of South Korea
Universities and colleges in Daejeon
Educational institutions established in 1951
1951 establishments in South Korea